Isaac Taylor Tichenor (November 11, 1825 – December 2, 1902) was President of the Agricultural and Mechanical College of Alabama, now known as Auburn University, from 1872 to 1881.

Early life
Isaac Taylor Tichenor was born in Kentucky on November 11, 1825.

Career
From 1852 to 1867, he served as pastor at the First Baptist Church in Montgomery, Alabama.

He served as a chaplain in the Confederate States Army during the American Civil War. In 1863, he still defended slavery in his sermons. After the war, he spent three years on his plantation in Shelby County, Alabama.

In 1871, he became pastor at the First Baptist Church in Memphis, Tennessee, but resigned shortly after. He also served as a pastor in Kentucky and Mississippi.

From 1872 to 1881, he served as President of the Agricultural and Mechanical College of Alabama, now known as Auburn University. In 1882, he became President of the Southern Baptist Home Missionary Board in Atlanta, Georgia.

Death
He died on December 2, 1902, and is buried in Westview Cemetery.

References

1825 births
1902 deaths
People from Spencer County, Kentucky
Military personnel from Montgomery, Alabama
People from Shelby County, Alabama
Southern Baptists
Confederate States Army chaplains
Presidents of Auburn University
Baptists from Alabama
Baptists from Kentucky
19th-century Baptists
19th-century American clergy